is a 1965 Japanese television series. It is the 3rd NHK taiga drama.

Story
Taikōki deals with the Sengoku period. Based on Eiji Yoshikawa's novels "Shinsho Taikōki". Now only episode 42 exists.

The story chronicles the life of Toyotomi Hideyoshi.

Production
Sword fight arranger - Kunishirō Hayashi

Cast

Toyotomi clan
Ken Ogata as Toyotomi Hideyoshi
Shiho Fujimura as Nene
Yoshiko Mita as Lady Chacha
Masakazu Tamura as Toyotomi Hidetsugu
Chieko Naniwa as Naka
Kōtarō Tomita as Toyotomi Hidenaga

Hideyoshi's vassals
Kōji Ishizaka as Ishida Mitsunari
Takahiro Tamura as Kuroda Kanbei
Yoshiki Takahashi as Shōjumaru
Yoshio Inaba as Katō Kiyotada
Katsutoshi Atarashi as Katō Kiyomasa
Kyū Sazanka as Hachisuka Koroku
Yoshiyuki Fukuda as Takenaka Hanbei
Gorō Wakamiya as Fukushima Masanori

Oda clan
Kōji Takahashi as Oda Nobunaga
Keiko Kishi as Oichi
Kazuko Inano aa Nōhime
Keiji Takamiya as Oda Nobutaka
Masao Kageyama as Oda Nobukatsu

Nobunaga's vassels
Jun Hamamura as Hirate Masahide
Kazuyuki Inoue as Sakuma Nobumori
Nakamura Kamon II as Shibata Katsuie
Kei Satō as Akechi Mitsuhide
Tatsuo Matsumura as Matsunaga Hisahide
Yūsuke Kawazu as Maeda Toshiie
Asao Koike as Araki Murashige
Kataoka Takao as Mori Ranmaru
Yoshio Kaneuchi as Ikeda Tsuneoki

Tokugawa clan
Onoe Kikuzō VI as Tokugawa Ieyasu
Takashi Toyama as Honda Tadakatsu
Yasunori Irikawa as Okudaira Nobumasa
Kazuo Kitamura as Torii Suneemon

Takeda clan
Sessue Hayakawa as Takeda Shingen
Fumio Watanabe as Takeda Katsuyori
Kenjirō Uemura as Baba Nobuharu
Shinjirō Asano as Anayama Baisetsu

Uesugi clan
Kenjirō Ishiyama as Uesugi Kenshin
Ichirō Izawa as Naoe Kagetsuna

Azai clan
Katsumi Ōyama as Azai Nagamasa
Terumi Niki as Ohatsu

Mōri clan
Hiroshi Nihon'yanagi as Kikkawa Motoharu
Shinsuke Mikimoto as Kikkawa Tsuneie
Shōichi Kuwayama as Ankokuji Ekei
Jun Tazaki as Shimizu Muneharu

Ashikaga clan
Ichimura Kakitsu XVI as Ashikaga Yoshiaki
Rokkō Toura as Hosokawa Fujitaka

Others
Shōgo Shimada as Sen no Rikyū
Kichijirō Ueda as Saitō Dōsan
Ichirō Mikuni as Imagawa Yoshimoto
Yoshio Tsuchiya as Sōtan
Frankie Sakai as Ofuku
Harue Akagi as Nagisa
Shōbun Inoue as Date Masamune
Shigeru Kōyama as Yamanaka Shikanosuke
Seiji Miyaguchi as Dr. Manase Dōsan
Nobuko Otowa as Oetsu, Fukushima Masanori's mother

References

1965 Japanese television series debuts
1965 Japanese television series endings
Taiga drama
1960s drama television series
Jidaigeki television series
Television shows based on Japanese novels
Cultural depictions of Akechi Mitsuhide
Cultural depictions of Date Masamune
Cultural depictions of Oda Nobunaga
Cultural depictions of Tokugawa Ieyasu
Cultural depictions of Toyotomi Hideyoshi